Tekkami Atchuta Rao (born 21 August 1986) was an Indian first-class cricketer who played for Andhra from 2008 to 2014. He made his first-class debut for Andhra in Ranji Trophy against Baroda during 2008-09 season in which he took a fifer.

He was picked as an uncapped player by Deccan Chargers for 2012 Indian Premier League.

References

External links
 

1986 births
Living people
Indian cricketers